An Elder Scrolls Legend: Battlespire is an action role-playing video game developed and published by Bethesda Softworks, set in the world of The Elder Scrolls.

Gameplay
Unlike other The Elder Scrolls games, Battlespire lacks a rest feature. Throughout the game, there are no merchants to buy items from, and consequently, there are no gold pieces to find. Enemies do not reset when the player leaves the area and they are also not randomized as they were in Arena and Daggerfall.

Bethesda introduced a multiplayer feature that included a cooperative mode to follow the single-player storyline online as well as a team-based versus mode to fight using all the same strategies from the single-player. This was done through the multiplayer network; the now-defunct GameSpy. Though no longer supported by Mplayer/GameSpy Arcade, one can still play through the Kali multiplayer network client, which supports and works with all the features in the game.

Plot
In Battlespire (named so after the training facility for battlemages), the player takes the role of an apprentice who, on the day of his final test, discovers that an army of Daedra led by Mehrunes Dagon has invaded and killed nearly everyone. On top of that, his partner is being held captive by Mehrunes Dagon himself. Over the course of seven levels, the player must travel through various realms of Oblivion to reach Mehrunes Dagon, defeat him and escape back to Tamriel.

Development
Following the release of Daggerfall, work began on three separate projects all at once: Battlespire, Redguard, and Morrowind. Battlespire, originally titled Dungeon of Daggerfall: Battlespire, was the first of the three to be released, on December 2, 1997.

Originally designed as an expansion pack for Daggerfall, Battlespire focuses on what Bethesda called "the best part of Daggerfall": dungeon crawling. Battlespire has a smaller scope than Daggerfall and prioritizes level design. Until The Elder Scrolls Online, it was the only game in the series to have deathmatch or multiplayer support. When Morrowinds scope turned out to be too difficult to implement, it was put on hold, and its staff were moved to work on Battlespire and Redguard. Battlespire was repackaged as a stand-alone game and sold as An Elder Scrolls Legend: Battlespire.

Julian Le Fay opted to use sprites for the enemies because he preferred the high level of detail possible with sprites over the blocky polygonal models of the time.

Reception

According to Stephan Janicki of Computer Gaming World, Battlespire and the related title The Elder Scrolls Adventures: Redguard were both "commercial failures."

Next Generation reviewed the game, rating it three stars out of five, and stated that "Battlespire is a step in the right direction. While it might not be revolutionary, it is a solid release that should provide hours of dungeon-crawling fun. We anxiously await the next installment."

Reviewers seemed unimpressed as a whole with Desslock of GameSpot noting that, compared against Daggerfall, "Battlespires less expansive scope, hack-and-slash gameplay, and technical problems ultimately provide a role-playing experience that is only occasionally satisfying."

References

External links
Official website

1997 video games
Action role-playing video games
Bethesda Softworks games
DOS games
DOS-only games
Games commercially released with DOSBox
Multiplayer and single-player video games
Role-playing video games
Battlespire
Video games developed in the United States
Video games featuring protagonists of selectable gender
XnGine games